is a railway station in Shirataka, Yamagata, Japan, operated by the Yamagata Railway.

Lines
Arato Station is the terminus on the Flower Nagai Line, and is located 30.5 rail kilometers from the opposing terminus of the line at Akayu Station.

Station layout
Arato Station has a single side platform.

Adjacent stations

History
Arato Station opened on 22 April 1923. The station was absorbed into the JR East network upon the privatization of JNR on 1 April 1987, and came under the control of the Yamagata Railway from 25 October 1988.

Surrounding area
Shirataka Town Hall
  National Route 287
  National Route 348

External links
  Flower Nagai Line 

Railway stations in Yamagata Prefecture
Yamagata Railway Flower Nagai Line
Railway stations in Japan opened in 1923